The Hundred in the Hands is the eponymous debut studio album by American electronic music duo The Hundred in the Hands, released on September 11, 2010 by Warp. The album received generally favorable reviews, with a Metacritic score of 74 out of 100, based on 13 reviews. In January 2011, the album earned the duo a nomination in the Pop/Rock category at The 10th Annual Independent Music Awards. The song "Pigeons" was used in the third episode of the fifth season of Gossip Girl, titled "The Jewel of Denial" and originally aired October 10, 2011.

Track listing

Notes
  signifies an additional producer

Personnel
Credits adapted from the liner notes of The Hundred in the Hands.

The Hundred in the Hands
 The Hundred in the Hands – production ; engineering ; additional engineering 
 Eleanore Everdell – vocals, keyboards, synthesizer
 Jason Friedman – bass, guitar, programming

Additional personnel
 Alex Aldi – engineering ; mixing ; programming 
 Eric Broucek – engineering, production ; mixing ; additional engineering ; additional programming 
 Heather Culp – photography
 Pete Hofmann – mixing 
 Jacques Renault – additional production, engineering ; additional programming ; additional engineering, production 
 Richard X – additional programming, production ; engineering ; additional engineering ; additional production 
 Vito Roccoforte – live drums 
 Noel Summerville – mastering
 Utters – additional engineering, additional production, additional programming 
 Chris Zane – engineering ; live drums, mixing, production ; programming

Release history

References

2010 debut albums
Albums produced by Richard X
The Hundred in the Hands albums
Warp (record label) albums